Sekolah Global Indo-Asia (SGIA) is an international school located in Batam, Indonesia. It is also a Cambridge International Examinations Center and an IB World School. The school offers IB Primary Years Programme for children in Pre-K until Year 5, Cambridge Checkpoint Programme for students in Year 6 - 8, and Cambridge IGCSE for students in Year 9 -  10. For the last two years of education, students take GCE A Level courses. Starting SY 2016 - 2017, students have the option to sit for the IB Diploma Programme instead of the traditional A Level. Students usually sit for the May - June examinations.

The languages of instruction are English, with Indonesian courses offered for students taking extra National Exam preparation classes and Mandarin / French being offered as an additional language.

References

External links

batam
Schools in Indonesia
Cambridge schools in Indonesia
Education in the Riau Islands
International Baccalaureate schools in Indonesia
International schools in Indonesia
Educational institutions established in 2000
2000 establishments in Indonesia